Niclas Huschenbeth (born 29 February 1992) is a German chess grandmaster and a two-time German Chess Champion (2010, 2019). He played in the Chess Olympiads of 2008 and 2010.

Chess career
Huschenbeth won the German championship in 2010. He came first in the 2011 HSK Großmeisterturnier in Hamburg. He came third in the 2013 National Chess Congress in Philadelphia. 

In March 2016, Huschenbeth earned clear first place in the Charlotte Chess Center's GM Norm Invitational held in Charlotte, North Carolina with an undefeated score of 7.0/9.

In 2019, Huschenbeth won the German championship for the second time with 8 out of 9 points, beating Dmitrij Kollars due to the higher average Elo rating of his opponents. He tied 3rd to 11th place in the 2019 European Individual Championship with Kacper Piorun, David Anton Guijarro, Ferenc Berkes, Sergei Movsesian, Liviu-Dieter Nisipeanu, Grigoriy Oparin, Maxim Rodshtein, and Eltaj Safarli.

References

External links

Niclas Huschenbeth at 365Chess.com
Niclas Huschenbeth - Official Website

Chess grandmasters
German chess players
Chess Olympiad competitors
1992 births
Living people